Samādhāna or samādhānam is a Sanskrit noun derived from the word, , and variously means – putting together, uniting, fixing the mind in abstract contemplation on the true nature of the soul, contemplate oneness, concentrated or formless meditation, commitment, intentness, steadiness, composure, peace of mind, complete concentration, clearing up of doubt or replying to the , agreeing or promising, a leading incident, justification of a statement, proof, reconciliation or eagerness.

Meaning 
 is the single-pointedness of the mind; it is the state of the mind which one has with a single goal in sight which is gained on the strength of the control of the mind and the senses, withdrawal from worldly pursuits, endurance of life-pangs and faith in the scriptures and teacher’s instructions.

In the Mahabharata (277:6),  is explained as the absorption of meditation or as that state of mind in which one has no longer any affection for the world.

Realisation of Brahman 
It is one of the four practices for the realisation of Brahman that directs the energy of consciousness towards moksha ('liberation') and not towards siddhi or vibhuti ('accomplishments').

In his Vivekachudamani (Sloka 26), Shankara explains that:

The perfect establishment of the buddhi always in the pure (nirguna) Brahman (free from all limitations) is said to be , not the indulgence of the mind (not giving free rein to the mind to stray at will).

Six virtues 
, which develops mental concentration, is one of the six virtues that a seeker after truth is expected to develop so as to cultivate the attitude of detachment from all selfish-ends;  it develops the ability to hold the mind on a single point. For achieving this qualification the mind is required to be sufficiently trained,  and is achieved by the combination of the other five virtues – sama, dama, uparati, titiksha and śraddhā. Shankara defines it as a state of poise and tranquility that the mind gains when it is trained to revel continuously in the concept of a perfect ideal, at once universal and omnipotent.

See also
 Samadhi
 Abstinence
 Mettā
 Vidyā (Clarity) 
 Yoga philosophy (Epistemology)

References

Vedanta
Sanskrit words and phrases
Hindu philosophical concepts